A kara is a steel or cast iron (sarb loh) bangle worn by Sikhs. It is expected to be worn by all Sikhs.
It is one of the five kakars or five Ks—external articles of faith—that identify a Sikh as dedicated to the religious order of Sikhism. The kara was instituted by the tenth Sikh guru Gobind Singh at the Baisakhi Amrit Sanchar in 1699. Guru Gobind Singh explained:

 
The Kara is a symbol of unbreakable attachment and commitment to God. As the Sikhs' holy text the Guru Granth Sahib says "In the tenth month, you were made into a human being, O my merchant friend, and you were given your allotted time to perform good deeds." Similarly, Bhagat Kabir reminds the Sikh to always keep one's consciousness with God: "With your hands and feet, do all your work, but let your consciousness remain with the Immaculate Lord." The kara is also worn by many Sikhs and other non-Sikh Indian families across the states in the North, North-West and West of India (such as Gujarat, Rajasthan, and even Maharashtra) by Hindus; moreover, the use of the kara by non-Sikhs is encouraged as it represents the "totality of God".

The basic kara is a simple unadorned iron bracelet, but other forms exist. The Kara is one of the most basic symbols of the Sikh faith. All Sikhs are expected to wear the Kara as all are expected to not cut their hair (a second very critical element of the identity of the Sikh). Both of these fall in the realm of the 5 articles worn by Sikhs as a part of their uniform.

It was also historically used like a knuckle-duster for hand-to-hand combat. Battlefield variations include kara with spikes or sharp edges. Sikh soldiers serving for the British army in India would settle disputes by competing in a form of boxing known as loh-muthi (lit. iron fist) with a kara on one hand.

See also
Kara (jewellery)

References

Punjabi words and phrases
Sikh religious clothing
Sikh terminology